Buskerud County Municipality was the regional governing administration of the old Buskerud county in Norway. The county municipality was established in its most recent form on 1 January 1976 when the law was changed to allow elected county councils in Norway. The county municipality was dissolved on 1 January 2020, when Buskerud was merged with the neighboring counties of Akershus and Østfold, creating the new Viken county which is led by the Viken County Municipality. The administrative seat is located in Drammen and the county mayor was Roger Ryberg.

The main responsibilities of the county municipality included the running of the 13 upper secondary schools. It managed all the county roadways, public transport, dental care, culture, and cultural heritage sites in the county. Public transport was managed through Vestviken Kollektivtrafikk.

County government
The Buskerud county council was made up of 43 representatives that were elected every four years. The council essentially acted as a Parliament or legislative body for the county and it met several times each year. The council was divided into standing committees and an executive board which met considerably more often. Both the council and executive board were led by the County Mayor who held the executive powers of the county. The final county mayor was Roger Ryberg.

County mayors
1976-1979: Arvid Berglind (Labour Party)
1980-1983: Arild Hiim (Conservative Party)
1984-1987: Åse Klundelien (Labour Party)
1988-1991: Hans Erik Riwen (Conservative Party)
1992-1999: Per Ulriksen (Labour Party)
1999-2007: Tor Ottar Karlsen (Labour Party)
2007-2011: Roger Ryberg (Labour Party)
2011-2015: Morten Eriksrød (Conservative Party)
2015-2019: Roger Ryberg (Labour Party)

County council
The party breakdown of the council is as follows:

References

 
County municipality
County municipalities of Norway
1838 establishments in Norway
2020 disestablishments in Norway